Doxocopa cyane, the Mexican emperor or cyan emperor, is a species of butterfly of the family Nymphalidae.

Subspecies
Subspecies include:
 Doxocopa cyane burmeisteri (Godman & Salvin, 1884) (Argentina)
 Doxocopa cyane cyane (Latreille, 1813) (Peru, Venezuela, Bolivia)
 Doxocopa cyane mexicana Bryk, 1953 (Mexico, Colombia)
 Doxocopa cyane vespertina Lamas, 1999 (Peru)

Distribution
This species is present in Peru, Venezuela, Bolivia, Argentina, Mexico and Colombia.

Habitat

Description
The color of the wings varies by sex. Males show a brilliant electric-blue iridescence on the  upperside of the wings, while the wings of the females lack this iridescence. Females have usually a brown ground color with wide longitudinal bands of orange and white on forewings and hindwings.

Biology
Larvae feed on Celtis spinosa. Males are solitary and territorial. They usually visit wet muddy patches and feed on rotting fruits, dung or carrion. Females mainly inhabit the forest canopy.

References

External links
 Butterflies of America
 Butterflies and Moths
 Frederick D. Godman et al. Lepidoptera-Rhopalocera. Vol. I (1879-1901)

Apaturinae
Butterflies described in 1813
Taxa named by Pierre André Latreille
Butterflies of North America
Nymphalidae of South America